Tyrone is a census-designated place in Grant County, New Mexico, United States. Its population was 637 as of the 2010 census.

Demographics

Description

The townsite was built by the Phelps Dodge mining company (now Freeport-McMoRan) to house miners. Between 1968 and 1972, there were 320 homes built; four or five more have been added since then. A large commercial building at the entrance to the townsite (on Highway 90) housed a post office and a general mercantile (now closed). The townsite included a baseball field, children's park, and ten acres of a grassy 'picnic park'. Large homes with extensive views on the top of the ridge were referred to as Bosses Hill homes. In the 1990s, the mining company divested itself of the homes, which are now privately owned.

See also

 List of census-designated places in New Mexico

References

External links

Census-designated places in New Mexico
Census-designated places in Grant County, New Mexico